Doennange is a village in the commune of Wincrange, in northern Luxembourg.  , the village has a population of 128.

History 

Before the formation of the commune of Wincrange on January 1, 1978, Doennange belonged to the former commune of Boevange.

Villages in Luxembourg
Wincrange